The 2022–23 Bethune–Cookman Wildcats men's basketball team represented Bethune–Cookman University in the 2022–23 NCAA Division I men's basketball season. The Wildcats, led by second-year head coach Reggie Theus, played their home games at Moore Gymnasium in Daytona Beach, Florida as members of the Southwestern Athletic Conference.

Previous season
The Wildcats finished the 2021–22 season 9–21, 7–11 in SWAC play to finish in tenth place. They failed to qualify for the SWAC tournament.

Roster

Schedule and results

|-
!colspan=12 style=| Non-conference regular season

|-
!colspan=12 style=| SWAC regular season

|-
!colspan=9 style=| SWAC tournament

Sources

References

Bethune–Cookman Wildcats men's basketball seasons
Bethune-Cookman Wildcats
Bethune-Cookman Wildcats men's basketball
Bethune-Cookman Wildcats men's basketball